Chakandra is a big traditional Indian village in Sheikhpura district, Bihar state, India, six kilometers away from Sheikhpura. The Pin Code of Chakandra is 811304

The regional language of this village is Magahi. The area of chakandra village is approx 21084 m². it is densely populated.Cast distributions of this village is Paswan, yadav, kumhar, noniya, dhanuk and sunni muslims
Historical Facts                                                                                                                                                                                                                                                                                                                                   Chakandra has a very ancient history, it has 7 feet tall Lord Vishnu statue in standing position and a 5 feet wide and 10 feet tall carved door frame of black rock, it is decorated with carved idols of yaksh and yakshinis playing music instruments.

Political Status

Mukhiya—Ravi singh

MLA—Vijay samrat (Rashtriya janta dal)

M.P -- Chirag Paswan

References

Villages in Sheikhpura district